Martin Browne may refer to:
E. Martin Browne (1900–1980), English theatre director
Martin Browne (politician), Irish Sinn Féin politician for Tipperary

See also
Martin Brown (disambiguation)